ThruSpace, also known in Europe as ThruSpace: High Velocity 3D Puzzle, and in Japan as , is a 2010 WiiWare game, developed by Japanese game developer Keys Factory, and published by Nintendo. Players play as a block known as a "Keydron", and use the Wii Remote to rotate the Keydron so it will fit in gaps in walls that approach it.

Gameplay 
Playing as a Keydron, players must rotate the Wii Remote to rotate the Keydron so it will fit in gaps that approach the player. There are multiple difficulty levels, each one changing Keydron to become more complex shapes. Occasionally, crystals appear in gaps in the wall, which will give the player bonus points when collected. Players play for a high score.

Reception 

ThruSpace received above-average reviews according to the review aggregation website Metacritic. Eurogamers Kristan Reed called the game "relatively simple", but still praised the game's difficulty.

Sequel 
ThruSpace received a sequel on the Nintendo 3DS, called Ketzal's Corridors. It follows the same gameplay loop of ThruSpace, but with a more distinct art style.

References 

2010 video games
Nintendo games
Puzzle video games
Video games developed in Japan
Wii games
Wii-only games
WiiWare games